The following notable deaths occurred in 2023. Names are reported under the date of death, in alphabetical order. A typical entry reports information in the following sequence:

 Name, age, country of citizenship at birth, subsequent nationality (if applicable), what subject was noted for, cause of death (if known), and reference.

March

21
Bob Johnston, 98, Australian economist, governor of the Reserve Bank of Australia (1982–1989).
Terry Norris, 92, Australian actor (Homicide, Cop Shop) and politician, Victorian MLA (1982–1992). (death announced on this date)

20
Syabda Perkasa Belawa, 21, Indonesian badminton player (PB Djarum, national team), traffic collision.
Dave Gardner, 70, Canadian ice hockey player (Montreal Canadiens, St. Louis Blues, California Golden Seals).
Paul Grant, 56, British actor (Return of the Jedi, Labyrinth, The Dead) and stuntman.
Bryn Hargreaves, 36–37, English rugby league player (Bradford Bulls, St Helens, Wigan Warriors). (body found on this date)
Maria Ilnicka-Mądry, 77, Polish politician, physician and academic, chair of the West Pomeranian Voivodeship Sejmik (since 2018).
Iurii Lapicus, 27, Moldovan mixed martial arts fighter, traffic collision.
Mario López Estrada, 84, Guatemalan telecommunications executive, founder of Tigo Guatemala.
Dmitry Nova, 34, Russian musician (Cream Soda), drowned.
Eduardo Ravani, 81, Chilean comedian, cancer.
Vasily Reshetnikov, 103, Russian pilot and World War II veteran, Hero of the Soviet Union. 
Abdul Rahman Majeed al-Rubaie, 83, Iraqi novelist (The Tattoo Mark).
Tom Ryan, 81–82, Irish hurler (Killenaule, Tipperary). (death announced on this date)
John Sattler, 80, Australian rugby league player (Kurri Kurri, South Sydney, national team).

19
Willie Cager, 81, American basketball player (Texas Western Miners).
Walter Gassire, 76, Uruguayan footballer (Deportivo Toluca, Atletas Campesinos, Tampico Madero).
Marisol Malaret, 73, Puerto Rican television host, model and beauty queen (Miss Universe 1970).
, 91, Portuguese politician and businessman, founder of Delta Cafés.
Petar Nadoveza, 80, Croatian football player (Hajduk Split, Yugoslavia national team) and manager (Olimpija Ljubljana).
Ralph Roberts, 87, New Zealand Olympic sailor (1960, 1968).
Csaba Schmidt, 43, Hungarian chemist and politician, MP (2010–2014) and mayor of Tatabánya (2010–2019).
Pōhiva Tuʻiʻonetoa, 71, Tongan politician, prime minister (2019–2021), minister of finance (2018–2019) and MP (since 2014).

18
Vladimir Chernavin, 94, Russian admiral, commander-in-chief of the navy (1985–1992), Hero of the Soviet Union.
Robert Lindsay, 29th Earl of Crawford, 96, Scottish peer, MP (1955–1974), member of the House of Lords (1974–2019) and minister of state for defence (1970–1972).
Gloria Dea, 100, American actress (King of the Congo, Plan 9 from Outer Space) and magician, coronary artery disease.
Bisi Egbeyemi, 78, Nigerian lawyer and politician, deputy governor of Ekiti State (2018–2022).
Harold Parks Helms, 87, American politician, member of the North Carolina House of Representatives (1974–1984).
Bhalchandra Kulkarni, 88, Indian actor (Pinjara, Dhoom Dhadaka, Thartharat).
Pekka Paavola, 89, Finnish politician, minister of justice (1972).
Joseph Powathil, 92, Indian Syro-Malabar Catholic prelate, eparch of Kanjirappally (1977–1985), auxiliary bishop (1972–1977) and archeparch (1985–2007) of Changanacherry.
Francisco Rodón, 88, Puerto Rican painter.
Spiros Simitis, 88, Greek-German jurist.
Valeri Sinau, 78, Russian football player (Rostov-on-Don, Zorya Luhansk) and manager (Kuban Krasnodar).
Pedro Solbes, 80, Spanish economist, twice minister of economy and finance, European Commissioner for Economic and Monetary Affairs (1999–2004) and second deputy prime minister (2004–2009), liver cancer.
Steven Ungerleider, 73, American sports psychologist, author and documentary film producer (Munich '72 and Beyond, End Game, Citizen Ashe).
Sverre Valen, 97, Norwegian choir conductor, founder of the Sandefjord Girls Choir.
Dot Wilkinson, 101, American Hall of Fame bowler and softball player.
Labo Yari, 80, Nigerian writer.

17
, 73, Italian politician, senator (1996–2001, 2006–2013) and deputy (2001–2006).
, 85, American screenwriter  (The Eiger Sanction, Zorro, The Gay Blade, Sssssss), cancer.
Adri Duivesteijn, 72, Dutch politician, member of the House of Representatives (1994–2006) and Senate (2013–2015), prostate cancer.
Jorge Edwards, 91, Chilean novelist and diplomat.
Sir Paul Girolami, 97, Italian-British pharmaceutical executive, chairman of Glaxo (1985–1994).
James Goldrick, 64–65, Australian naval historian and analyst, lymphoma and leukaemia.
Fuzzy Haskins, 81, American Hall of Fame singer (Parliament-Funkadelic).
John Jenrette, 86, American politician, member of the U.S. House of Representatives (1975–1980) and the South Carolina House of Representatives (1964–1972).
Pierre Michaud, 86, Canadian lawyer and judge, chief justice of Quebec (1994–2002).
Jean-Bernard Ndongo Essomba, Cameroonian politician, MP (1992–1997, since 2002).
Fito Olivares, 75, Mexican cumbia musician.
, 94, Mexican writer, journalist and politician, senator (1997–2000) and founder of La Jornada.
Lance Reddick, 60, American actor (The Wire, Fringe, John Wick) and musician.
Mary Ronnie, 96, Scottish-born New Zealand librarian, national librarian (1976–1981).
Raoul Servais, 94, Belgian filmmaker, animator, and comics artist (Harpya).
Mick Slattery, 77, British guitarist (Hawkwind).
Guy Troy, 100, American Olympic pentathlete (1952).
Dubravka Ugrešić, 73, Croatian-Dutch writer.
Laura Valenzuela, 92, Spanish television presenter (TVE) and actress (Spaniards in Paris, Growing Leg, Diminishing Skirt), complications from Alzheimer's disease.
Ed Winter, 73, American coroner.
Tilman Zülch, 83, German human rights activist, founder of the Society for Threatened Peoples.

16
Stephen Bromhead, 66, Australian politician, New South Wales MLA (since 2011), mesothelioma.
Tony Coe, 88, English jazz musician.
Ángel Fournier, 35, Cuban Olympic rower (2008, 2012, 2016), heart attack.
Claude Fournier, 91, Canadian film director (The Tin Flute, The Mills of Power, Alien Thunder), screenwriter and cinematographer, heart attack.
Patrick French, 57, British writer and historian (Tibet, Tibet, The World Is What It Is), cancer.
Jacqueline Gold, 62, British businesswoman (Ann Summers), breast cancer.
Peter Hardy, 66, Australian actor (The Pursuit of Happiness, McLeod's Daughters, Dangerous Remedy), drowned.
Don Megson, 86, English football player (Sheffield Wednesday, Bristol Rovers) and manager (Portland Timbers). (death announced on this date)
José Francisco Moreira dos Santos, 94, Portuguese Roman Catholic prelate, bishop of Uíje (1979–2008).
Victor Ocampo, 71, Filipino Roman Catholic prelate, bishop of Gumaca (since 2015).
, 80, Italian psychiatrist.
, 94, French television director.
Brian Walsh, 68, Australian television executive (Foxtel).
Nani Widjaja, 78, Indonesian actress (Cinta Pertama, Catatan Si Boy, Maling Kutang), respiratory failure.

15
Théo de Barros, 80, Brazilian composer and musician (Quarteto Novo).
, 86, French horn player.
Pierluigi Concutelli, 78, Italian terrorist (Ordine Nuovo) and convicted murderer.
Ron Cooper, 95, British Olympic boxer (1948).
Jeff Gaylord, 64, American professional wrestler (UWF, WCCW) and football player (Toronto Argonauts).
Stuart Hodes, 98, American dancer.
Odd Hoftun, 95, Norwegian engineer and missionary.
Sameer Khakhar, 70, Indian actor (Nukkad, Pushpaka Vimana, Shahenshah), multiple organ failure.
Roman Lentner, 85, Polish footballer (1960 Olympics, Górnik Zabrze).
Aleksander Łuczak, 79, Polish historian and politician, minister of national education (1993–1995).
, 85, Italian politician.
, 87, Spanish businessman and convicted fraudster.
Mimis Papaioannou, 80, Greek football player (AEK Athens, national team) and manager (New York Pancyprian-Freedoms).
Ronald Rice, 77, American politician, member of the New Jersey Senate (1986–2022), cancer.
Jonas Šimėnas, 69, Lithuanian politician, MP (1990–1992, 1996–2000, 2008–2012).
Antje Vollmer, 79, German politician, MP (1983–1985, 1987–1990, 1994–2005).
Thomas Wagner, 46, Austrian footballer (Mattersburg).

14
Alexander F. Andreev, 82, Russian theoretical physicist.
Bobby Caldwell, 71, American singer ("What You Won't Do for Love") and songwriter ("The Next Time I Fall").
Jacques Cossette-Trudel, 76, Canadian screenwriter and political activist (Front de libération du Québec).
, Chinese screenwriter (Journey to the West) and playwright.
Louisette Dussault, 82, Canadian actress (Françoise Durocher, Waitress, IXE-13, Wedding Night) and writer.
Jim Ferree, 91, American golfer.
Ángel Floro Martínez, 83, Spanish Roman Catholic prelate, bishop of Gokwe (2000–2017).
Sergei Grigoryants, 81, Russian human rights activist and Soviet dissident.
Leslie Hardcastle, 96, British arts administrator (BFI).
Russ Hoggard, 93, New Zealand athletics coach.
Kim Yong-chul, 98, South Korean jurist and judge, chief justice (1986–1988).
Valery Loshchinin, 82, Russian diplomat, ambassador to Belarus (1996–1999).
Luigi Piccatto, 68, Italian comic artist (Dylan Dog).
Nukhim Rashkovsky, 76, Russian chess player and coach, Grandmaster (1980).
Antonina Uccello, 100, American politician, mayor of Hartford, Connecticut (1967–1971).
Ved Pratap Vaidik, 78, Indian journalist, fall.
Richard Wagner, 70, Romanian-born German novelist.

13
Nicholas Calabrese, 80, American contract killer.
, 57, Brazilian bassist (Raimundos).
Simon Emmerson, 67, English musician (Weekend, Working Week, Afro Celt Sound System), record producer and DJ.
Anatoliy Fedorenko, 55, Russian actor (What a Wonderful Game, Moscow Chill).
Jim Gordon, 77, American drummer (Derek and the Dominos, Traffic), songwriter ("Layla") and convicted murderer.
Terry Grier, 86, Canadian university administrator and politician, MP (1972–1974).
Mabo Ismaila, 78, Nigerian football manager (women's national team).
Eden Knight, 23, Saudi Arabian trans woman, suicide.
Momoko Kuroda, 84, Japanese poet and essayist, brain hemorrhage.
Edward Leavy, 93, American jurist, judge on the U.S. District Court for Oregon (1984–1987) and U.S. Court of Appeals for the Ninth Circuit (since 1987).
, 84, Italian cinematographer (Don Giovanni, Light Drops, Teza).
Jack McLaughlin, 93, Australian cricketer (Queensland).
Karol Mikuláš, 100, Slovak miner.
Eliseu Padilha, 77, Brazilian lawyer and politician, chief of staff of the presidency (2016–2019), minister of transport (1997–2001) and three-time deputy.
Joe Pepitone, 82, American baseball player (New York Yankees, Houston Astros, Chicago Cubs), World Series champion (1962).
Pat Schroeder, 82, American politician, member of the U.S. House of Representatives (1973–1997), complications from a stroke.
Vera Selby, 93, English snooker and billiards player.
Chris Shevlane, 80, Scottish footballer (Heart of Midlothian, Hibernian, Greenock Morton).
Cyprian Tseriwa, 86, Zimbabwean Olympic runner (1960).
Ernst Tugendhat, 93, Czechoslovak-born German philosopher.
Marija Ujević-Galetović, 89, Croatian sculptor.
Pradeep Uppoor, 65, Indian film producer (Ardh Satya, Aghaat, Chakra).
Glen Weir, 71, Canadian Hall of Fame football player (Montreal Alouettes).
Barbro Westerholm, 89, Swedish doctor and politician, MP (1988–1999, 2006–2022).

12
Franca Afegbua, 79, Nigerian politician, senator (1983).
Dame Phyllida Barlow, 78, British visual artist.
Alphonse Beni, 77, Cameroonian actor and film director.
Isabel Colegate, 91, British author (The Shooting Party) and literary agent.
Chris Cooper, 44, American-Italian baseball player (San Marino, Italy national team), heart attack.
Rolly Crump, 93, American animator and designer (Walt Disney Imagineering).
Dix Denney, 65, American guitarist (The Weirdos, Thelonious Monster).
Anatoly Dryukov, 86, Russian diplomat, ambassador to Singapore (1987–1990), India (1991–1996), and Armenia (1998–2005).
Dick Fosbury, 76, American high jumper (Fosbury Flop), Olympic champion (1968), lymphoma.
Jiang Yanyong, 91, Chinese physician and political dissident, pneumonia.
Karel Kaplan, 94, Czech historian.
Liam Kearns, 60, Irish Gaelic football player (Austin Stacks) and manager (Offaly, Limerick).
Marek Kopelent, 90, Czech composer and composition professor (Academy of Fine Arts in Prague).
Li Laizhu, 90, Chinese military officer, commander of the Beijing Military Region (1993–1997) and deputy (1988–1993).
Susan Cunliffe-Lister, Baroness Masham of Ilton, 87, British politician, member of the House of Lords (since 1970) and Paralympic champion (1960, 1964).
Jaume Medina, 73, Spanish philologist.
Dragoslav Mihailović, 92, Serbian writer.
Rudel Obreja, 57, Romanian Olympic boxer (1984).
, 82, Brazilian actor (Casa da Mãe Joana, Casa da Mãe Joana 2, Muito Prazer).
Felton Spencer, 55, American basketball player (Minnesota Timberwolves, Utah Jazz, Golden State Warriors).
, 91, Canadian Roman Catholic prelate, coadjutor bishop (1984–1986) and bishop (1986–1997) of Saint John, New Brunswick.

11
Ahlem Belhadj, 59, Tunisian women's rights activist.
Erik Rud Brandt, 79, Danish fashion designer.
Chen Kenichi, 67, Japanese chef (Iron Chef), interstitial lung disease.
Chuanyin, 96, Chinese Buddhist monk, master of the Buddhist Association of China (2005–2010).
Costa Titch, 27, South African rapper.
R. Dhruvanarayana, 61, Indian politician, MP (2009–2019), cardiac arrest.
Oleksandr Dovbiy, 69, Ukrainian football player (Metalist Kharkiv, SKA Kyiv) and manager (Naftovyk Okhtyrka).
Amy Fuller, 54, American rower, Olympic silver medalist (1992), complications from breast cancer.
Bud Grant, 95, American basketball player (Minneapolis Lakers), Hall of Fame football player (Winnipeg Blue Bombers) and coach (Minnesota Vikings).
Guo Zhi, 98, Chinese politician, deputy (1978–1998).
Angel Hobayan, 93, Filipino Roman Catholic prelate, bishop of Catarman (1975–2005).
John Jakes, 90, American author (North and South, The Kent Family Chronicles).
William G. Johnsson, 88, Australian author.
Keith Johnstone, 90, British-Canadian theatre director and educator (Impro: Improvisation and the Theatre).
Karoline Käfer, 68, Austrian Olympic sprinter (1972, 1980).
Ignacio López Tarso, 98, Mexican actor (Rosa Blanca, Esmeralda, Wild at Heart), pneumonia.
Alexandru Mesian, 86, Romanian Greek Catholic hierarch, coadjutor bishop (1994–1995) and bishop (since 1995) of Lugoj.
Takeshi Noma, 88, Japanese politician, member of the House of Councillors (1992–2004).
Ivonne Passada, 66, Uruguayan politician, MP (2005–2020) and speaker of the Chamber of Representatives (2010–2011).
Michel Peyramaure, 101, French writer.
Bill Tidy, 89, British cartoonist (The Cloggies, The Fosdyke Saga).

10
Jesús Alou, 80, Dominican baseball player (San Francisco Giants, Houston Astros, Oakland Athletics), World Series champion (1973, 1974).
William R. C. Blundell, 95, Canadian business executive.
Niall Brophy, 87, Irish rugby union player (Leinster, national team, British & Irish Lions).
Junior English, 71–72, Jamaican reggae singer.
Kevin Freeman, 81, American equestrian, Olympic silver medalist (1964, 1968, 1972).
Naonobu Fujii, 31, Japanese volleyball player (Toray Arrows, national team), stomach cancer.
Juan Francisco García Sánchez, 86, Spanish judge, magistrate of the Supreme Court (1999–2006).
Antonín Hájek, 35, Czech Olympic ski jumper (2010, 2014). (death announced on this date)
Dick Haley, 85, American football player (Washington Redskins, Minnesota Vikings, Pittsburgh Steelers).
Rolland Hein, 90, American college professor and scholar.
Masatoshi Ito, 98, Japanese businessman (7-Eleven).
Seiichi Kaneta, 75, Japanese politician, MP (1993–2009), cerebral hemorrhage.
Rafael de Mendizábal Allende, 95, Spanish judge, president of the National Court (1977–1986, 1991–1992) and magistrate of the Constitutional Court (1992–2001).
Napoleon XIV, 84, American singer ("They're Coming to Take Me Away, Ha-Haaa!").
René Olmeta, 88, French politician, deputy (1981–1986).
Juvencio Osorio, 72, Paraguayan footballer (Cerro Porteño, Espanyol, national team).
, 98, Greek playwright, writer and poet.
Dhiruben Patel, 96, Indian novelist, playwright and translator.
Demetrio Perez Jr, 77, Cuban-American educator and politician.
, 92, Czech historian.
Vefa Tanır, 96, Turkish politician, minister of national defense (1995–1996), forestry (1991–1993) and twice of health.
Tongo, 65, Peruvian singer and comedian, kidney failure.
Anthony Verga, 87, American politician, member of the Massachusetts House of Representatives (1995–2009).
Janusz Weiss, 74, Polish radio broadcaster, co-founder of Radio ZET.
Michael Wilford, 84, English architect (The Lowry, Embassy of the United Kingdom, Berlin).
Noriaki Yamada, 71, Japanese politician, fall.

9
Robert Blake, 89, American actor (Baretta, In Cold Blood, Lost Highway), Emmy winner (1975), heart disease.
Roland Castro, 82, French architect and political activist.
William R. Cotter, 87, American lawyer, president of Colby College (1979–2000).
Mark Crutcher, 74, American anti-abortion activist and author, founder of Life Dynamics Inc., heart attack.
Lily Yulianti Farid, 51, Indonesian writer, researcher and cultural activist. 
Hassan Ghafourifard, 79, Iranian academic and politician, minister of energy (1981–1985) and three-time MP.
Shiro Hashizume, 94, Japanese swimmer, Olympic silver medallist (1952), prostate cancer.
Alan Jones, 77, Welsh footballer (Hereford United, Swansea City, Southport).
Olga Kataeva, 68, Russian actress (Anxious Sunday).
Robin Lumley, 74, British jazz keyboardist (Brand X), heart failure.
Raphael Mechoulam, 92, Bulgarian-born Israeli organic chemist.
Daud Muzamil, Afghan Taliban politician and militant, governor of Nangarhar (2021–2022) and of Balkh (since 2022), bombing.
Mystic Meg, 80, British astrologer, influenza.
Dave Nicoll, 78, British motocross racer.
Chikage Oogi, 89, Japanese actress (A Teapicker's Song of Goodbye) and politician, president of the House of Councillors (2004–2007) and minister of land (2001–2003), esophageal cancer.
Samaraditya Pal, 84, Indian lawyer.
Fazalur Rehman, 81, Pakistani field hockey player, Olympic champion (1968).
Sir Sebastian Roberts, 69, British major general.
, 65, Kyrgyz film director and screenwriter (Songs from the Southern Seas).
Al Jawhara bint Abdulaziz Al Saud, Saudi Arabian royal. 
Randhir Singh, 65, Indian cricketer (national team).
Jan Syczewski, 85, Polish politician, MP (1997–2001).
Otis Taylor, 80, American football player (Kansas City Chiefs), Super Bowl champion (1970), complications from Parkinson's disease. 
Pearry Reginald Teo, 44, Singaporean film director (The Gene Generation, Witchville, The Curse of Sleeping Beauty) and producer.
Phil Titus, 36, British bass guitarist (Morning Parade).
Fernando Valdés Dal-Ré, 77, Spanish jurist and academic, magistrate of the Constitutional Court (2012–2020).

8
Marcel Amont, 93, French singer.
Paul Anselin, 91, French politician, mayor of Ploërmel (1977–2008).
Richard A. N. Bonnycastle, 88, Canadian business executive (Harlequin Enterprises). 
Hendrik Brocks, 80, Indonesian Olympic cyclist (1960).
Gianmarco Calleri, 81, Italian football player (Novara) and executive, president of Lazio (1986–1992) and Torino (1994–1997).
Jim Durkin, 58, American thrash metal guitarist (Dark Angel).
Italo Galbiati, 85, Italian football player (Lecco) and manager (Milan).
Bert I. Gordon, 100, American film director and screenwriter (Village of the Giants, Empire of the Ants, The Amazing Colossal Man).
Martin Gorry, 68, English footballer (Barnsley, Hartlepool United, Newcastle United).
Satish Kaushik, 66, Indian film director (Hum Aapke Dil Mein Rehte Hain), actor (Mr. India, Brick Lane), and comedian, heart attack.
Dolores Klaich, 86, American author and activist, assisted suicide.
Josua Madsen, 45, Danish drummer (Artillery), traffic collision.
Jim Moeller, 67, American politician, member of the Washington House of Representatives (2003–2017), complications from Parkinson's disease.
Tish Naghise, 59, American politician, member of the Georgia House of Representatives (since 2023).
, 63, Indian actress (Pakalppooram).
Grace Onyango, 98, Kenyan politician, mayor of Kisumu (1965–1969) and MP (1969–1983).
Joe Pamensky, 92, South African cricket administrator, president of the South African Cricket Union.
Ranjeet Singh Judeo, 80, Indian politician, Uttar Pradesh MLA.
Chaim Topol, 87, Israeli actor (Fiddler on the Roof, Flash Gordon, For Your Eyes Only), complications from Alzheimer's disease.
Abraham Zarem, 106, American scientist (Manhattan Project).

7
Ibtisam Abdallah, 80, Iraqi writer and translator.
Vlastislav Antolák, 80, Czech teacher and politician, deputy (2002–2006).
Grant Bridger, 75, New Zealand actor (Merry Christmas, Mr. Lawrence, We're Here to Help), singer and dancer.
Michael Brimer, 89, South African-Australian organist, pianist, and conductor.
Serghei Ciuhrii, 84, Moldovan conductor, composer and teacher.
Yevgenia Dudka, 32, Ukrainian soldier.
Ian Falconer, 63, American author (Olivia) and illustrator (The New Yorker), kidney failure.
Władysław Findeisen, 97, Polish control theorist, academic and politician. 
Salvador García-Bodaño, 87, Spanish poet, member of the Royal Galician Academy (since 1992).
Marcel Gatsinzi, 75, Rwandan politician, minister of defence (2002–2010).
Denise Goddard, 77, British Olympic artistic gymnast (1964). (death announced on this date)
J. A. W. Gunn, 85, Canadian political philosopher.
André Haefliger, 93, Swiss mathematician (Haefliger structure).
Anton Ionescu, 83, Romanian politician, deputy (1996–2004).
Dmytro Kotsiubailo, 27, Ukrainian soldier, shot.
Prafulla Kumar Jena, 91, Indian metallurgist, member of the Indian Academy of Sciences.
Augusto Lauro, 99, Italian Roman Catholic prelate, bishop of San Marco Argentano-Scalea (1979–1999).
Tom Love, 85, American entrepreneur, founder of Love's.
Pat McCormick, 92, American diver, four-time Olympic champion (1952, 1956).
Jitendra Nath Mohanty, 95, Indian philosopher.
Lynn Seymour, 83, Canadian-born British ballerina and choreographer.
Khatijun Nissa Siraj, 97, Singaporean women's rights activist.
, 73, Dutch television producer (Lingo) and presenter, mesothelioma.
Peterson Zah, 85, American politician, president of the Navajo Nation (1991–1995).
Andrei Zlotnikov, 52, Belarusian sociologist and politician, deputy (since 2019).

6
Abdulrahman al-Ansary, 87, Saudi Arabian archaeologist.
Masum Babul, 60, Bangladeshi film dance director and choreographer (Beder Meye Josna, Keyamat Theke Keyamat, Ekti Cinemar Golpo).
Georgina Beyer, 65, New Zealand politician and transgender rights activist, mayor of Carterton (1995–2000) and MP (1999–2007).
Harvey Carignan, 95, American serial killer.
Américo Duarte, 80, Portuguese politician and trade unionist, member of the constituent assembly (1975). 
Sergey Grishin, 56, Russian-American businessman and engineer.
Ivana Hloužková, 62, Czech actress (The Fortress, Boredom in Brno).
, 70, Ukrainian footballer (Shakhtar Donetsk, Chornomorets Odesa, Metalurh Zaporizhzhia).
, 92, Japanese ceramicist.
Pavel Kharin, 95, Russian sprint canoeist, Olympic champion (1956).
, 82, Czech linguist and academic.
Traute Lafrenz, 103, German-American resistance fighter (White Rose).
Eric Alan Livingston, 38, American musician (Mamaleek).
Toru Miyoshi, 95, Japanese judge, chief justice (1995–1997).
Ken Money, 88, Canadian astronaut, scientist, and Olympic high jumper (1956).
Seiko Obonai, 83, Japanese Olympic shot putter (1964).
Benigno Luigi Papa, 87, Italian Roman Catholic prelate, archbishop of Taranto (1990–2011) and bishop of Oppido Mamertina-Palmi (1981–1990).
Spiros Papadopoulos, 91, Greek politician, MP (1985–1993).
Gérard Pelisson, 91, French hotelier, co-founder of Accor.
Alfonso Quaranta, 87, Italian magistrate, president of the Constitutional Court (2011–2013).
Kuppuswami Sampath, 75, Indian footballer (Dempo, national team).
Heinz Schwarz, 94, German politician, MP (1976–1990), minister of the interior of Rhineland-Palatinate (1971–1976) and member of the Landtag (1959–1976).
Wally Smith, 96, British-born American mathematician.
Wyndham St. John, 63, Canadian Olympic equestrian (2000).
Mario Telò, 72, Italian political scientist and researcher.
Josef Vojta, 87, Czech footballer (Sparta Prague, Czechoslovakia national team), Olympic silver medallist (1964).
Wang Xiaomo, 84, Chinese radar engineer, member of the Chinese Academy of Engineering and deputy (1998–2008).

5
Azwar Anas, 91, Indonesian politician, coordinating minister for people's welfare (1993–1998), minister of transportation (1988–1993) and governor of West Sumatra (1977–1987).
Praveen Anumolu, Indian cinematographer (Darsakudu), heart attack.
Francisco J. Ayala, 88, Spanish-American evolutionary biologist and philosopher.
Richard Aylmer, 91, British Olympic cross-country skier (1956).
Klaus Bonsack, 81, German luger, Olympic champion (1968).
Arif Cooper, Jamaican musician, record producer and DJ.
Heen Banda Dissanayaka, 85, Sri Lankan civil servant, governor of the Central Bank of Ceylon (1992–1995).
Sharifa Fadel, 84, Egyptian singer and actress.
Piero Gilardi, 80, Italian sculptor.
Bob Goodman, 83, American Hall of Fame boxing promoter.
Bob Goody, 71, British actor (Flash Gordon, Fire, Ice and Dynamite, Lighthouse) and writer, cancer.
Frank Griswold, 85, American clergyman, presiding bishop of the Episcopal Church (1998–2006).
Antal Hetényi, 75, Hungarian Olympic judoka (1972).
Tom Hsieh, 91, American politician, member of the San Francisco Board of Supervisors (1986–1997).
Ilkka Järvi-Laturi, 61, Finnish-born American film director (Spy Games).
Karounga Keïta, 81, Malian football player (Girondins de Bordeaux) and official.
Qavi Khan, 80, Pakistani actor (Mitti Ke Putlay, Begum Jaan, Nahin Abhi Nahin), cancer.
Takahiro Kimura, 58, Japanese animator (City Hunter, Brigadoon: Marin & Melan, Godannar), amyloidosis.
Matti Klinge, 86, Finnish historian.
Tate Makgoe, 59, South African politician and anti-apartheid activist, Free State MPL (since 1994), traffic collision.
Kenneth Montgomery, 79, British conductor, pneumonia.
Pierluigi Onorato, 84, Italian magistrate and politician, deputy (1979–1987), senator (1987–1992).
Mark Pilgrim, 53, South African radio broadcaster (5FM, 94.7 Highveld Stereo) and television presenter (Big Brother Africa), lung cancer.
, 74, American politician, complications following surgery.
Pedro Rodrigues Filho, 68, Brazilian serial killer, shot.
Gary Rossington, 71, American Hall of Fame guitarist (Lynyrd Skynyrd, Rossington Collins Band).
Shozo Sasahara, 93, Japanese wrestler, Olympic champion (1956).
Maurice Scully, 70–71, Irish poet.
Sylviane Telchid, 81, Guadeloupean writer, complications from Alzheimer's disease.
Imre Vagyóczki, 90, Hungarian Olympic sprint canoer (1956).
James Douglass West, 93, American television writer (Lassie).
Dave Wills, 58, American sportscaster (Tampa Bay Rays, Chicago White Sox).

4
Romualdo Arppi Filho, 84, Brazilian football referee, kidney disease.
Dietmar Artzinger-Bolten, 82, German lawyer and politician, president of 1. FC Köln (1987–1991).
Phil Batt, 96, American politician, governor of Idaho (1995–1999), member of the Idaho House of Representatives (1965–1967) and twice of the Senate.
Heinz Baumann, 95, German actor (I'm an Elephant, Madame, Und Jimmy ging zum Regenbogen, All People Will Be Brothers).
Jacques Boigelot, 93, Belgian film director (Peace in the Fields) and screenwriter.
Paulo Caruso, 73, Brazilian cartoonist.
Sueli Costa, 79, Brazilian composer and singer.
Roel Degamo, 56, Filipino politician, governor of Negros Oriental (since 2011), shot.
Jack Doris, 92, Canadian politician, mayor of Peterborough (1992–1997).
Joseph Gabriel Fernandez, 97, Indian Roman Catholic prelate, bishop of Quilon (1978–2001).
, 50, Spanish politician, member of the City Council of Barcelona (since 2020).
Márcio Guedes, 76, Brazilian sports journalist, cancer.
Robert Haimer, 69, American musician (Barnes & Barnes) and songwriter ("Fish Heads").
Judith Heumann, 75, American disability rights activist.
, 80, Chinese actress (Liu Sanjie).
John Nagenda, 84, Ugandan cricketer (East Africa, national team).
Yaroslava Plaviuk, 96, Ukrainian women's rights activist, first lady in exile (1989–1992).
János Rácz, 81, Hungarian Olympic basketball player (1964).
Michael Rhodes, 69, American bassist (The Notorious Cherry Bombs).
Jean-Michel Rosenfeld, 88, French Holocaust survivor and politician.
Andre Smith, 64, American basketball player (Nebraska Cornhuskers).
Donald Snyder, 71, American politician, member of the Pennsylvania House of Representatives (1981–2000).
Spot, 71, American record producer (Damaged, Milo Goes to College, Zen Arcade).
Leo Sterckx, 86, Belgian cyclist, Olympic silver medallist (1960).
Christos Zanteroglou, 82, Greek footballer (Olympiacos, Egaleo, national team).

3
Bruno Astorre, 59, Italian politician, senator (since 2013), suicide by jumping.
Barbara Everitt Bryant, 96, American market researcher, director of the United States Census Bureau (1989–1993).
Robert Chase, 84, British football executive, chairman of Norwich City F.C. (1985–1996).
Sasthipada Chattopadhyay, 81, Indian novelist (Pandab Goenda), stroke.
Edwin A. Dawes, 97, British biochemist and magician.
Mohie El Din El Ghareeb, 90, Egyptian economist, minister of finance (1996–1999).
Christopher Fowler, 69, English novelist, cancer.
Carlos Garnett, 84, Panamanian-American jazz saxophonist.
Dana Hyde, 55, American businesswoman and government official, injuries sustained from plane turbulence.
Hiroshi Imai, 81, Japanese politician, MP (1993–2000, 2003–2009), aspiration pneumonia.
Antal Jancsó, 88, Hungarian tennis player.
Sara Lane, 73, American actress (The Virginian, I Saw What You Did), breast cancer.
Dane Lanken, 77–78, Canadian author and journalist.
Lee San Choon, 87, Malaysian politician, MP (1959–1983), minister of labour (1974–1978) and transport (1979–1983).
Pierre Legendre, 92, French historian and psychoanalyst.
David Lindley, 78, American musician (Kaleidoscope, The Section) and singer ("Mercury Blues").
Jaak Lipso, 82, Estonian basketball player (CSKA Moscow), Olympic silver (1964) and bronze (1968) medallist.
, 78, British peer, member of the House of Lords (1989–1999).
Julien Manzano, 85, French footballer (Forbach, Red Star, Boulogne).
Argentina Menis, 74, Romanian discus thrower, Olympic silver medallist (1972).
Satyabrata Mookherjee, 90, Indian politician, MP (1999–2004).
Franco Mulas, 84, Italian painter.
Calvin Newton, 93, American gospel singer (The Oak Ridge Boys, Sons of Song).
Kenzaburō Ōe, 88, Japanese novelist (A Personal Matter, The Silent Cry), Nobel Prize laureate (1994).
Rita O'Hare, 80, Northern Irish political activist.
, 79, Brazilian actor (So Normal, Curitiba Zero Grau).
Tom Sizemore, 61, American actor (Black Hawk Down, Saving Private Ryan, Heat), complications from a brain aneurysm.
Camille Souter, 93, British-born Irish artist.
Margherita Spiluttini, 75, Austrian photographer.
Lou Stovall, 86, American painter.
, 68, Polish production designer and set decorator (Poznań '56).
Yuri Zhukov, 85, Russian historian.
, 107, Israeli army colonel.

2
Aziz Mushabber Ahmadi, 90, Indian jurist, chief justice (1994–1997), chancellor of Aligarh Muslim University (2003–2010).
Mary Bauermeister, 88, German visual artist (Fluxus).
Giuseppe Cacciatore, 77, Italian philosopher, member of the Accademia dei Lincei.
Chandrashekhar Dasgupta, 82, Indian diplomat.
Lokenath Debnath, 87, Indian-American mathematician, founder of the International Journal of Mathematics and Mathematical Sciences.
Frank Dickson, 91, New Zealand banker.
, 71, Russian painter, stage and graphic artist.
Phil Hopkins, 73, American basketball coach (Western Carolina Catamounts).
Theodore Kanamine, 93, American brigadier general, cancer.
Bassma Kodmani, 64, Syrian academic and political dissident, cancer.
Per Kristoffersen, 85, Norwegian footballer (Fredrikstad, national team).
Steve Mackey, 56, English bassist (Pulp) and record producer.
José Molíns, 90, Spanish Olympic long-distance runner (1960).
Ryuho Okawa, 66, Japanese religious leader, founder of Happy Science.
Bertie O'Brien, 71, Irish hurler and Gaelic footballer (St Finbarr's, Cork GAA).
María Onetto, 56, Argentine actress (Montecristo, The Headless Woman, The Heavy Hand of the Law).
Dell Raybould, 89, American politician, member of the Idaho House of Representatives (2000–2018).
C. Paul Robinson, 81, American physicist.
Wayne Shorter, 89, American jazz saxophonist (The Jazz Messengers, Miles Davis Quintet, Weather Report), 12-time Grammy winner.
Nicholas Snowman, 78, British arts administrator, fall.
Gothart Stier, 84, German singer.
Rafael Viñoly, 78, Uruguayan architect (432 Park Avenue, 20 Fenchurch Street), aneurysm.
Joachim Zeller, 70, German politician, MEP (2009–2019).

1
Ahmed Arab, 89, Algerian footballer (1960 Olympics, national team).
Boris Bim-Bad, 81, Russian educator.
Ted Donaldson, 89, American actor (A Tree Grows in Brooklyn, Adventures of Rusty, Father Knows Best), complications from a fall.
Wally Fawkes, 98, Canadian-British jazz clarinettist and satirical cartoonist.
Just Fontaine, 89, French footballer (Nice, Reims, national team).
Leon Hughes, 92, American musician (The Coasters).
Alexey Inzhievsky, 88, Russian diplomat and politician.
Olga Kennard, 98, Hungarian-born British crystallographer, founder of the Cambridge Crystallographic Data Centre.
Anise Koltz, 94, Luxembourgish author.
, 101, Italian partisan.
Dan McGinn, 79, American baseball player (Montreal Expos, Chicago Cubs, Cincinnati Reds).
Allan McGraw, 83, Scottish football player (Hibernian, Linfield) and manager (Greenock Morton).
Lorna Milne, 88, Canadian academic and politician, senator (1995–2009).
, 45, Indian actor (Saathire, Mate Ta Love Helare, Love Express).
Phyllis Perkins, 89, British Olympic middle-distance runner (1960). (death announced on this date)
Julian Peter, Pakistani army major general.
, 100, Brazilian geologist.
Neela Ramgopal, 87, Indian Carnatic vocalist.
Jerry Richardson, 86, American football player (Baltimore Colts) and executive (Carolina Panthers).
Warren Saunders, 88, Australian cricketer (New South Wales).
Irma Serrano, 89, Mexican actress (Tiburoneros, El monasterio de los buitres, Las amantes del señor de la noche) and singer, heart attack.
Carlo Stelluti, 78, Italian politician, deputy (1996–2001).
Joseph Edra Ukpo, 85, Nigerian  Roman Catholic prelate, auxiliary bishop (1971–1973) and bishop (1973–2003) of Ogoja, archbishop of Calabar (2003–2013).
Boybits Victoria, 50, Filipino basketball player (Pop Cola Panthers, San Miguel Beermen), heart attack.
Peter Weibel, 78, Austrian post-conceptual artist.

Previous months
 Deaths in January 2023
 Deaths in February 2023

References

External links
The Guardian (UK) obituaries
The Telegraph (UK) obituaries
Obituaries, Chicago Tribune
Obituaries, Los Angeles Times
The New York Times, obituaries
The Washington Post obituaries
The Sydney Morning Herald (Australia) obituaries

 
Lists of deaths in 2023